Uchkeken (Yuçköken) is a rural locality (a selo) and the administrative center of Malokarachayevsky District in the Karachay-Cherkess Republic, Russia. Population:

Demographics
In 2002, the main ethnic groups were:
Karachays: 91.6%
Russians: 3.9%

Notable People 
Zuhra Bayramkulova - Hero of Socialist Labour has a street named after her in Uchkeken.

References

Rural localities in Karachay-Cherkessia